The men's qualification for football tournament at the 1999 All-Africa Games.

Qualification stage

Zone I (North Africa)
Libya and Morocco withdrew.

Algeria qualified.

Zone II (West Africa 1)
Tournament held in Bamako, Mali. Guinea withdrew.

Mali qualified.

Zone III (West Africa 2)
Tournament held in Ghana. Liberia withdrew.

Ivory Coast qualified.

Zone IV (Central Africa)
First round

Second round

Third round

Cameroon qualified.

Zone V (East Africa)
First round

Second round

Third round

Uganda qualified.

Zone VI (Southern Africa)
First round

Second round

Third round

Fourth round

Zambia qualified.

Zone VII (Indian Ocean)

Mauritius qualified.

Qualifying teams
The following countries have qualified for the final tournament:

External links
African Games 1999 - Rec.Sport.Soccer Statistics Foundation

Qualification
1999